WAOL (99.5 MHz) is a commercial FM radio station licensed to Ripley, Ohio, and serving the southeastern suburbs of the Cincinnati metropolitan area.  It carries a hot adult contemporary radio format and is owned by Donald Bowles and Venita Frame Bowles, through licensee Dreamcatcher Communications, Inc.  It calls itself "99-5 The Edge."

WAOL has an effective radiated power of 13,000 watts.  The transmitter is off Vermillion Pike in Stonewall, Kentucky.

History
In 1993, the station signed on the air.  It formerly aired an Adult Hits music format as "Max FM," then relaunched as "The Edge" in October 2013 after a period of identifying as simply "The New 99.5 WAOL."

References

External links

Adult hits radio stations in the United States
Radio stations established in 1993
AOL
1993 establishments in Ohio